Acrocercops diatonica is a moth of the family Gracillariidae, known from Karnataka, India, as well as West Malaysia, Papua New Guinea, and Thailand. It was described by Edward Meyrick in 1916. The hostplant for the species is Theobroma cacao and Mangifera species.

References

diatonica
Moths of Asia
Moths described in 1916